Boen Tek Bio (Chinese: 文德廟, English: Temple of Literature and Virtue) is the oldest Chinese temple in Tangerang, Indonesia. It is located at the corner of Jalan Bhakti and Jalan Cilame in the heart of Pasar Lama, Tangerang's old market district.

Founded in 1684, Boen Tek Bio is an intrinsic part of the history of Tangerang, in particular the history of Chinese settlement in the area (see: Benteng Chinese). The oldest part of the present structure dates back to 1775. The temple underwent significant renovation in 1844 with its right and left wings added in 1875, and an inner courtyard in 1904.

Boen Tek Bio has a long history of association with the colonial Chinese bureaucracy ('Kapitan Cina') of Tangerang. The donors for the temple's burial grounds in 1878 include all of the sitting Chinese officers of Tangerang:
 Lim Tjong Hien, Kapitein der Chinezen
 Lim Mo Gie, Luitenant der Chinezen
 Oey Khe Tay, Luitenant der Chinezen
 Tan Tiang Po, Luitenant der Chinezen

The temple foundation received its official government charter on 6 January 1912.

See also
 Kim Tek Ie Temple (金德院), Jakarta
 Vihara Bahtera Bhakti (安卒大伯公廟), Jakarta
 Tay Kak Sie Temple (大覺寺), Semarang
 Sanggar Agung (宏善堂), Surabaya
 Hoo Ann Kiong Temple (護安宮), Riau
 Ban Hin Kiong Temple (萬興宮), Manado
 Gunung Timur Temple (東嶽觀), Medan
 Satya Dharma Temple (保安宮), Bali

References

1684 establishments in the Dutch Empire
Religious organizations established in the 1680s
Buildings and structures in Banten
Chinese Indonesian culture
Tourist attractions in Banten